The 2016 CERH European Roller Hockey U-17 Championship was the 35th edition of the CERH European Roller Hockey Juvenile Championship. It was held in Mieres, Spain from 4 to 10 September 2016.

Group stage

Group A

4 September 2016

5 September 2016

6 September 2016

7 September 2016

8 September 2016

Group B

4 September 2016

5 September 2016

6 September 2016

7 September 2016

8 September 2016

Knockout stage

Championship

5th - 8th playoff

9th–10th playoff

Final standing

See also
 Roller Hockey
 CERH European Roller Hockey Juvenile Championship

References

European Roller Hockey Juvenile Championship
2016 in Spanish sport
2016 in roller hockey
International roller hockey competitions hosted by Spain